The Panthers Wroclaw are an American football team in Wrocław, Poland, which was merged from Giants Wrocław and Devils Wrocław (both founded in 2005). They currently play in the newly formed European League of Football since 2021.

In the past, they played in domestic leagues PLFA until 2017 and in the LFA (2018–2020); and in international leagues IFAF Europe Champions League (2016) and CEFL (2017–2019). For the 2021 season they announced their intention to participate in the European League of Football that plans to hold its inaugural season that year.

History
The team was founded in 2013 by a merger of two PLFA teams, Giants Wrocław and Devils Wrocław. In 2014, the club played in the Polish Bowl for the first time, where they lost to Seahawks Gdynia. In 2016, the Panthers dominated every game and won their first Championship. The Panthers won the title by defeating Seahawks, 56–13. After the Panthers won also the 2017 Polish Bowl, the team left the Polish American Football League and joined the new Liga Futbolu Amerykańskiego. In first two seasons in LFA, Panthers won every game in regular season, lost Polish Bowl XIII to Lowlanders Białystok 14–13 in 2018 and won Polish Bowl XIV to Lowlanders 28–14 (both final games were played at Wrocław Olympic Stadium).

The Panthers also became the first Polish team to win the IFAF Europe Champions League.

During the COVID-19 lockdown, Jakub Samel was named new head coach of the Panthers Wrocław. He is the first Polish head coach in club history. It was also announced that the club would be one of the first 8 to join the new European League of Football that is set to start in June 2021.

Uniforms 
The Panthers Wrocław's Panther blue home jersey has black numbers, letter outlines and vertical stripes on opposite sides. The away kit consists of a white jersey with dark blue letters and numbers that have orange outlines. Players wear white socks, black helmets with a panther head logo, and black pants to all games.

Roster

Staff

Season-by-season records

Honours
 Polish Bowl (PLFA)
Champions: 2016, 2017
 Runners-up: 2014, 2015
 Polish Bowl (LFA)
Champions: 2019, 2020
 Runners-up: 2018
 IFAF Europe Champions League
Champions: 2016

The Crew Wrocław/Giants Wrocław
 Polish Bowl (PLFA)
 Champions: 2007, 2011, 2013
 Runners-up: 2009, 2010

Devils Wrocław
 Polish Bowl (PLFA)
 Champions: 2010
 Runners-up: 2011

References

External links
 Official Website
 Facebook
 Twitter
 YouTube

2013 establishments in Poland
American football teams established in 2013
American football teams in Poland
Sport in Wrocław
European League of Football teams